The Ferndale Area Junior-Senior High School is a public high school, located at 600 Harlan Avenue, Ferndale, Cambria County, Pennsylvania. It serves the boroughs of Brownstown, Dale and Lorain as well as Middle Taylor Township. In 2014, Ferndale Area Junior Senior High School's enrollment was reported as 337 pupils in 7th through 12th grades. The current high school buildings opened in 1931 and 1938 and were renovated between 1978 and 1979. They also have had a couple different renovation projects over the years.

Ferndale Area Junior Senior High School serves the boroughs of: Brownstown, Dale, Ferndale, and Lorain as well as Middle Taylor Township - none of which border on each other.

Extracurriculars
The Ferndale Area School District offers a wide variety of clubs, activities and an extensive, publicly funded sports program.

Athletics
The high school's mascot is the Yellowjacket. The school's official colors are black and yellow, with white and/or black often appearing in athletics uniforms. Ferndale Area Junior-Senior High School is a member of the Western Pennsylvania Athletic Conference (WestPAC)] for most sports.

Junior High School Sports Programs

Boys
Baseball
Basketball
Golf

Girls
Basketball
Softball 
Volleyball

According to PIAA directory July 2014

Boys Varsity
 Baseball - Class A
 Basketball - Class A
 Football - Class A
 Golf - Class AA

Girls Varsity
 Basketball - Class A
 Golf - Class AA
 Softball - Class A
 Volleyball - Class A

References

External links
 District Homepage

High schools in Central Pennsylvania
Educational institutions established in 1928
Schools in Cambria County, Pennsylvania
Public high schools in Pennsylvania
1938 establishments in Pennsylvania